Dario G is the stage name of English musician Paul Spencer. Dario G was originally a trio, who are best known for their 1997 hit "Sunchyme", which reached number 2 on the UK Singles Chart. The group formed in Cheshire, England and consisted of three DJs and producers Scott Rosser, Paul Spencer and Stephen Spencer (the Spencers are not related).

The group changed their name from Dario to Dario G after being threatened with legal action from an artist of the same name. True to popular belief, the name Dario G was named after the manager of Crewe Alexandra F.C., Dario Gradi, and the similarity to Gradi was not a complete coincidence. Paul Spencer also said they added the G in tribute to the American jazz saxophonist Kenny G. Rosser and Stephen Spencer later left to pursue other projects leaving Paul Spencer to perform in a solo capacity.

Music journalist R J Formeta, writing for Vent Magazine in 2018, described Dario G as being "one of the world's finest DJs and performers."

History

In 1997, they reached number 2 on the UK Singles Chart with "Sunchyme", a song built around a sample of "Life in a Northern Town", a number 15 hit for the Dream Academy in 1985, and peaked at number 5 with the follow-up "Carnaval de Paris", relating to the 1998 FIFA World Cup in France. "Sunchyme" also hit number-one on the U.S. Hot Dance Club Party chart.

In 1998, they released their first album, Sunmachine.

In March 2000, their third single "Voices", featuring vocals from Vanessa Quiñones and produced by Peter Oxendale, was used for the film The Beach.

In January 2001, Dario G released "Dream to Me", with vocals by Ingfrid Straumstøyl, which is based on the song "Dreams" by the Cranberries. "Dream to Me" reached number 9 on the UK Singles Chart and number 9 in Germany. November 2001 saw their next release, "Say What's on Your Mind". The song had club mixes from Almighty Records and Stonebridge. In early 2003, Dario G released "Heaven Is Closer (Feels Like Heaven)", with vocals also by Ingfrid Straumstøyl, which is a remake of the 1980s hit "(Feels Like) Heaven" by Fiction Factory. It reached number 39 on the UK Singles Chart. Dario G released their second album In Full Colour in 2001. Another their song from the album "In Full Colour" with vocals by Ingfrid Straumstøyl is "Strobe".

A new version of "Carnaval de Paris" was released in 2002, for the World Cup in South Korea and Japan.

A new single "Ring of Fire" was promoted throughout Europe in 2006. It borrowed the main trumpet melody from the Johnny Cash recording of the same name. The single itself was released in September 2006.

In 2010, Dario G recorded a new song, "Game On" along with rapper Pitbull, for the Official FIFA 2010 World Cup soundtrack.

On 23 February 2014, Dario G's single "We Got Music" was released. The song featured Shirley Bassey and got its first play on BBC Radio 2 on the Paul O'Grady show.

In September 2018, Dario G released "Cry". Writing for Vents Magazine, music journalist R G Formeta described the single as having a "catchy melody, infectious rhythm[s], uplifting vocals and a unique, timeless energy in a modern sounding production." In an interview for the same article, Dario G said “The principle idea took under an hour. I knew I was onto something, so I waited patiently for other ideas to fall into my lap over a few weeks to craft it into what you now hear. The title 'Cry' was something that I felt summed up the emotion of listening back to what I'd created. It's a powerful and euphoric 'Cry' rather than a sad one. I was picturing people dancing and being lifted by the soaring soprano vocals and strings, while the "Higher" chant is there to take the euphoria to an even higher level.”

Discography

Studio albums

Singles

See also
List of number-one dance hits (United States)
List of artists who reached number one on the US Dance chart

References

English electronic music groups
English dance music groups
British Eurodance groups
British musical trios
English record producers
Remixers
Musical groups from Cheshire